The  women's 1500 metres at the 2009 World Championships in Athletics was held at the Olympic Stadium between 18–23 August. It was originally won by Natalia Rodríguez of Spain, but she was disqualified for tripping Gelete Burka of Ethiopia. Burka had been in the lead for the majority of the race, but Rodríguez had caught up and tripped Burka. Burka ended up finishing last and was visibly upset of what had happened. Rodríguez was disqualified. Defending champion Maryam Yusuf Jamal of Bahrain received the gold, Lisa Dobriskey of Great Britain received the silver, and Shannon Rowbury of the United States received the bronze. In addition, Mariem Alaoui Selsouli of Morocco was disqualified before the final for testing positive for Erythropoietin. She was not replaced.

Medalists

Records

Qualification standards

Schedule

Results

Heats
Qualification: First 6 in each heat (Q) and the next 6 fastest (q) advance to the semifinals.

Key:  NR = National record, PB = Personal best, Q = qualification by place in heat, q = qualification by overall place, SB = Seasonal best

Semifinals
Qualification: First 5 in each semifinal (Q) and the next 2 fastest (q) advance to the final.

Final

References
General
Specific

1500 metres
1500 metres at the World Athletics Championships
2009 in women's athletics